Farman Fathalian (born December 20, 1970), is an Iranian guitarist and Persian Rock singer.

Biography

Fathalian was born on December 20, 1970, in Tehran . He started learning Violin when he was five years old.

After Iran's revolution music centers were closed, but he continued practicing until he learned how to play flamenco guitar. He started teaching flamenco guitar in 1989. He had loved Indian music and Indian instruments and he migrated to India in 1992 to study and learned how to play Tabla. He returned to Tehran in the same year.

After he returned to Tehran he formed a concert group named "Ilia" and he started holding concerts with his group on October in 1992. He became known after this concert. He continued performing until 1998.

He introduced a new style of rock to Iran's music portfolio. He combined guitar and Indian instruments such as Tabla.

Recordings 

In 1999, he published his first official album Moghim. The lyrics were about Ali , the first Imam of Muslims.

He published his second album in 2001 Raahe Eshgh. The name is a Persian word, in English meaning Path of Love. The lyrics were also about Ali.

He published his third album in 2003 Mast o Kharab. Some of its lyrics were also about Ali.

He published another album in 2009 named Ba Mardome Biganeh.

Discography

Studio albums

 Moghim , 1999 Peygham Sahar
 Raahe Eshgh , 2001 Avang Tar 
 Mast O Kharab , 2003 Irangaam
 Ba Mardome Biganeh (The Others) , 2009 Golchin Records
  Dideye Bidar  , 2016

Singles

 Aghooshe Seda  , 2015

References

External links
 

Living people
21st-century Iranian male singers
Iranian pop singers
Iranian singer-songwriters
Iranian guitarists
1970 births
21st-century guitarists
20th-century Iranian male singers